Thorntonville is a town in Ward County, Texas, United States. The population was 476 according to the 2010 census.

Geography

Thorntonville is located at  (31.579803, –102.923722).

According to the United States Census Bureau, the town has a total area of 0.8 square miles (2.0 km2), all of it land.

Climate

According to the Köppen Climate Classification system, Thorntonville has a semi-arid climate, abbreviated "BSk" on climate maps.

Demographics

As of the census of 2000, there were 442 people, 187 households, and 137 families residing in the town. The population density was 564.7 people per square mile (218.8/km2). There were 220 housing units at an average density of 281.1 per square mile (108.9/km2). The racial makeup of the town was 85.97% White, 0.23% African American, 0.45% Native American, 0.23% Asian, 9.73% from other races, and 3.39% from two or more races. Hispanic or Latino of any race were 31.22% of the population.

There were 187 households, out of which 24.1% had children under the age of 18 living with them, 62.0% were married couples living together, 8.0% had a female householder with no husband present, and 26.7% were non-families. 23.5% of all households were made up of individuals, and 16.6% had someone living alone who was 65 years of age or older. The average household size was 2.36 and the average family size was 2.77.

In the town, the population was spread out, with 20.4% under the age of 18, 6.8% from 18 to 24, 21.9% from 25 to 44, 31.2% from 45 to 64, and 19.7% who were 65 years of age or older. The median age was 46 years. For every 100 females, there were 90.5 males. For every 100 females age 18 and over, there were 93.4 males.

The median income for a household in the town was $30,938, and the median income for a family was $40,078. Males had a median income of $30,156 versus $13,750 for females. The per capita income for the town was $17,210. About 10.2% of families and 14.8% of the population were below the poverty line, including 22.2% of those under age 18 and 11.6% of those age 65 or over.

Education
The Town of Thorntonville is served by the Monahans-Wickett-Pyote Independent School District.

References

Towns in Ward County, Texas
Towns in Texas